The Klang War or Selangor Civil War was a series of conflicts that lasted from 1867 to 1874 in the Malay state of Selangor in the Malay Peninsula (modern-day Malaysia).

It was initially fought between Raja Abdullah, the administrator of the Klang Valley, and Raja Mahdi. It was joined by Tengku Kudin (Tengku Dhiauddin, also spelt Ziauddin), a Kedahan prince, as well as other Malay and Chinese rival factions. The war was eventually won by Tengku Kudin and Abdullah's son, Raja Ismail.

Background
In 1854, the sultan of Selangor Sultan Muhammad Shah appointed Raja Abdullah bin Raja Ja'afar as governor of the Klang Valley. Raja Abdullah and his brother Raja Juma'at had previously helped Raja Sulaiman settle a debt incurred during a failed mining venture, and was therefore rewarded with the governorship of the Klang Valley.  Raja Mahdi, the grandson of Sultan Muhammad Shah, was the son of Raja Sulaiman who previously served as governor of the Klang Valley; Raja Mahdi hence became disinherited with Raja Abdullah's appointment to the post.

Raja Abdullah and Raja Juma'at, who had opened very successful tin mines in Lukut (near today's Port Dickson, Negeri Sembilan), obtained funding for the exploration of new tin mines near Kuala Lumpur, at the confluence of the rivers Klang and Gombak, in 1857. The new mines were successful, generating considerable revenue, and the struggle for the control of the revenues from the tin mines, as well as political power, were essentially the triggers for the war.

Sultan Muhammad died in 1857, and Sultan Abdul Samad succeeded him after a power struggle. Sultan Abdul Samad however only has direct control over Langat, then the state capital, and did not have absolute control over the rest of Selangor, which was then organized into four riverine provinces - the Bernam Valley, Kuala Selangor, the Klang Valley, and Lukut - which were administered by four autonomous chieftains or governors. When the disgruntled Raja Mahdi initiated the conflict, the Malays were split into two camps in the ensuing war. On Raja Mahdi's side were Raja Mahmud, son of the Panglima Raja of Selangor; Raja Hitam of the Bernam Valley; as well as Sumatran immigrants led by Mohamed Akib and his younger brother Mohamed Tahir (later conferred the title of 'Dato Dagang'). Raja Abdullah's faction included his son, Raja Ismail who continued the war after Raja Abdullah's death, later joined by the Kedahan prince, Tengku Kudin and supported by Sultan Abdul Samad himself. The Chinese tin miners were also divided between the two camps.

Some of the Malays however switched sides in the course of the war: for example the Dato Dagang, Mohamed Tahir. who helped Raja Mahdi conquer Klang city from Raja Abdullah, eventually switched to Tengku Kudin's side. Syed Mashhor, an Arab-Malay fighter from Pontianak, came to Selangor after a failed rebellion against the Brooke administration in Sarawak. He initially supported Raja Abdullah's cause but switched to that of Raja Mahdi. Raja Muda Musa of Kuala Selangor also went over to Raja Mahdi's side.

In the later stages of the conflict Tengku Kudin managed to gain the support of British colonial administrators and volunteers from neighbouring Pahang.

Initial conflict

In 1866, Raja Abdullah authorised two traders from the Straits Settlements - William Henry Macleod Read and Tan Kim Ching - to collect taxes from the opium trade in the Klang Valley - a business Raja Mahdi was also involved in. Raja Mahdi objected to the tax collection, on the reasoning that he should be exempted as he was part of the Selangor royalty, and refused to pay. Raja Abdullah saw this as an act of defiance by Raja Mahdi towards him. This incident, exacerbated by Raja Mahdi's continued dissatisfaction with being ignored as the successor to Sultan Muhammad for the Selangor throne following his death in 1857, in favour of the then Raja Abdul Samad (later became Sultan Abdul Samad), as well as further conflicts between their followers, worsened the already tense relationship between the two princes, which many believe were the initial causes for the outbreak of the Klang War.

At that time there was also a long-standing animosity between the Bugis Malays (the Selangor royal family were of Bugis origin) and the Batu Bara clan who are of Sumatran origin. Raja Abdullah, himself a Bugis, refused to punish a fellow member of the Bugis clan he had sent to guard Bukit Nanas in Kuala Lumpur (the site of the present-day Kuala Lumpur Tower), who murdered a villager from the Batu Bara clan. Angered by Raja Abdullah's refusal to punish the murderer or paying compensation for the death of one of his men as an alternative, the Batu Bara clan leader, Mohamed Akib, informed Raja Mahdi of the incident and pledged his support for him if he wanted to fight against Raja Abdullah.  Raja Mahdi, supported by some Sumatran traders, then laid siege to the fort of Klang town (now known as Raja Mahdi fort).  Mohamad Akib however was shot and killed in 1867 while attempting an assault at the fort, and his younger brother Mohamed Tahir assumed leadership of the Batu Bara clan. Mohamad Akib's body together with several other slain Sumatran Malays were buried within the grounds of the fort, where their graves still remain there to this day.

Raja Abdullah evacuated with his family to the Straits Settlement of Malacca, where he later died, while his two sons, Raja Ismail and Raja Hasan, continued with the fighting. In March 1867, Raja Mahdi captured the fort of Klang, conquering the city. One of Abdullah's sons, Raja Ismail, returned with three small ships to lay siege to Klang City, but was unable to retake it.

Chinese Kongsi Involvement
When the Selangor Civil War broke out, Kapitan Cina of Kuala Lumpur Yap Ah Loy was faced with internecine fighting among dissident Chinese groups as well as attacks from other Malay factions. The two largest Chinese gangs, the Kuala Lumpur-based Hai San  and the Selayang-based Ghee Hin, had engaged in fighting to gain control of tin production in the town.  The Chinese factions would eventually join opposing sides in the civil war, with the Ghee Hin siding with Raja Mahdi, and the Hai San with Yap Ah Loy siding with Tengku Kudin.

At Kanching (near Selayang), the headman Yap Ah Sze, who was an ally of Yap Ah Loy, was murdered, most likely at the instigation of Chong Chong, another Hakka headman.  Yap Ah Loy, the Chinese Kapitan of Kuala Lumpur, went to Kanching with his men to drive out Chong Chong, and many from the Kanching faction were killed. Chong Chong then took refuge in Rawang and joined Raja Mahdi's faction.

Yap Ah Loy initially stayed neutral in the Klang War, choosing to deal with whoever that was in power. After Raja Mahdi conquered Klang City, he had in fact organised a ceremony to formally invest Yap into the office of Kapitan in 1869. When Klang City fell to Tengku Kudin, Yap recognized Tengku Kudin's authority, after meeting him by chance in Langat, thereby making him an enemy of Raja Mahdi. Chong Chong soon joined Syed Mashhor on two failed offensives on Kuala Lumpur.

Tengku Kudin enters the war

In 1867, Tunku Dhiauddin Zainal Rashid, also known as Tengku Kudin, a prince from Kedah (then part of Siam), married into the Selangor royal family. The Sultan appointed his son-in-law as Viceroy of Selangor to arbitrate between the warring parties, first on 26 June 1868.

Raja Mahdi however flatly rejected the peace effort. Offended by this, Tengku Kudin opted to support Raja Ismail instead.

At the same time, cracks emerge between Raja Mahdi and his erstwhile ally, Mohamed Tahir (the Dato' Dagang), head of the Sumatran Batu Bara clan. Raja Mahdi had earlier promised to grant Tahir administrative authority in the interior provinces of Selangor, in exchange for Tahir's assistance in his offensive on Klang City. However, after his earlier victory over Raja Abdullah at Klang in March 1867, nothing was granted to the Dato Dagang. To make things worse, a relative of Raja Mahdi had killed one of the Dato's followers in a scuffle. The Dato Dagang demanded that justice be done upon the perpetrator according to the adat ganti darah (blood money) Malay custom, but Raja Mahdi ignored his requests. As a result, Dato Dagang withdrew his support for Raja Mahdi, and indicated to Tengku Kudin of his willingness to be on his side against Raja Mahdi, which Tengku Kudin gladly accepted. The Dato Dagang also informed Tengku Kudin (and Sultan Abdul Samad) that he was able, through his contacts in Singapore, to supply them weapons and ammunition in their fight against Raja Mahdi.

In March 1870, Raja Ismail with help from Tengku Kudin laid siege to Klang and drove out Raja Mahdi, who retreated to Kuala Selangor, which he captured from Raja Musa with help from Raja Hitam. Syed Mashhor, who served under Tengku Kudin, was sent to Kuala Selangor to help Raja Musa but switched sides after learning that his brother had been killed by a son of the Sultan.  Raja Mahdi allied with the Chinese in Kanching who were enemies of Yap, then attacked Kuala Lumpur in 1870 with the Malay forces led by Syed Mashhor, and again in 1871, but both attacks were unsuccessful.

Meanwhile, the conflict brought disruption to the economy and trade in the British Straits Settlements, as well as raising concerns over security, especially the occurrences of piracy. The British became increasingly involved in the affairs of Selangor.  In July 1871, an attack by pirates on ships was traced to Raja Mahdi's stronghold in Kuala Selangor. The British attacked and captured Kuala Selangor as a result, driving out Mahdi's men out and handed the town to Tengku Kudin. Kudin however refused to yield control of revenue from the province to Raja Musa who had previously ruled Kuala Selangor, which prompted Raja Musa to join Mahdi's side. The Sultan of Selangor, who had bestowed the governorship of the Langat province upon Tengku Kudin to help him fund his war, also began to be concerned about the rising influence of Tengku Kudin.

End of war

In 1872, Raja Mahdi gained the support of a number of Malay chiefs, some of them members of Selangor Royal family. Raja Asal and Sutan Puasa, the leaders of Mandailing diaspora in Selangor, also switched their support to Raja Mahdi's side.  Raja Mahdi's forces attacked Kuala Lumpur, and Raja Asal laid siege to Bukit Nanas, where Tengku Kudin's forces of 500 soldiers and European mercenaries were stationed. Some of Tengku Kudin's men attempted a breakthrough, but they were captured in Petaling and killed. Yap Ah Loy managed to escape to Klang, while Kuala Lumpur was razed to the ground and Kuala Selangor was recaptured by Raja Mahdi's forces.

Yap, however, was determined to regain Kuala Lumpur, and assembled a force of around 1,000 men.  Tengku Kudin requested the Sultan of Pahang for assistance in 1872, and the Bendahara Wan Ahmad of Pahang sent him 1,000 men and other reserves in response. He also gained the support of the British colonial administrator Sir Andrew Clarke.  In March 1873, Kudin's men, supported by Pahang fighters, defeated Syed Mashhor in Kuala Lumpur, and Mashhor fled to Perak. The fighting went on for a few more months, but on 8 November 1873 the Pahang forces captured Kuala Selangor and the war largely ended.  In 1874 Raja Mahdi went into exile in Johore and then Singapore, where he died in 1882.

Aftermath

Despite winning the war, Tengku Kudin was viewed with suspicion by the royal family of Selangor. His Pahang allies also refused to return to Pahang because they wanted to collect tax as payment for their service, and their refusal to leave made the situation worse for Tengku Kudin. The leader of the Pahang forces was authorised to collect revenue in the provinces of Kuala Selangor and Klang, while J. G. Davidson and others who helped funded Tengku Kudin were given favourable concessions on mining land for ten years in Selangor.  While the British through the new Governor Andrew Clarke was on Tengku Kudin's side, the post-war situation had weakened his position. Kudin remained the Viceroy of Selangor until 1878, but he had already left for Kedah by 1876, and later went on to live in Penang.

The war was significant enough that British subjects asked for compensation for their loss of capital invested in Klang. Also, traders from Malacca petitioned the British colonial authorities for their losses subjected from the war.

British Resident
A significant development in this period is the beginning of direct British involvement in the affairs of the Malay states.  The British were concerned about the disruption caused by the war to their trade and investments in the region, eventually siding with Tengku Kudin, in part because Mahdi and some of his followers had attacked shipping in the Straits of Malacca. Colonial Secretary James W. W. Birch voiced his support for Tengku Kudin and lent him a ship to blockade Kuala Selangor, and Governor Sir Harry Ord also encouraged Pahang to back Tengku Kudin with fighters. Previously the British had a policy of non-intervention even though they had at times become engaged in local disputes. This war and other conflicts such as the Larut War in Perak led to the official abandonment of this policy in September 1873 by the Earl of Kimberley, Secretary of State for the Colonies, and set into motion the beginning of British administration in the Malay States.

In October 1875, Sultan Abdul Samad sent a letter to Andrew Clarke requesting that Selangor become a British protectorate. James Guthrie Davidson, a lawyer from Singapore, was soon appointed as the first British Resident of Selangor.  This came after the signing of the 1874 Pangkor Agreement with the Sultan of Perak that marked the beginning of a period of indirect rule of the Malay states by the British Residents serving as advisers to the sultans.

See also
 British Malaya

References

Further reading
 Zainal Abidin bin Abdul Wahid; Khoo Kay Kim; Muhd Yusof bin Ibrahim; Singh, D.S. Ranjit (1994). Kurikulum Bersepadu Sekolah Menengah Sejarah Tingkatan 2. Dewan Bahasa dan Pustaka. 
 1911 Encyclopædia Britannica. Malay States.
 Haji Buyong Adil; Sejarah Johor Dewan Bahasa dan Pustaka.

Conflicts in 1867
Conflicts in 1868
Conflicts in 1869
Conflicts in 1870
Conflicts in 1871
Conflicts in 1872
Conflicts in 1873
Conflicts in 1874
History of Selangor
History of Kuala Lumpur
Civil wars in Malaysia
Wars involving pre-independence Malaysia